Pain brié is a traditional Normandy bread. Its name comes from the pounding of the dough, as "brie" is derived from the Old Norman verb brier, meaning "to pound". The preparation includes a long kneading period and a beating of the dough, which tightens it, producing a heavy, yeasted bread with a tight crumb. It used to be the bread given to fishermen and sailors.

References
The Concise Larousse Gastronomique: The World's Greatest Cookery Encyclopedia, Prosper Montagne, 2003. p169.
The Breads of France: And How to Bake Them in Your Own Kitchen, Bernard Clayton, 2002. p88.

French breads
Yeast breads